The Snowfall Trilogy is a series of three fantasy novels written by Mitchell Smith. Set in a post-apocalyptic near future, the novels explore a vision of how the Earth might be after another Ice Age caused by Jupiter changing orbit. The cover artworks of all three books were illustrated by Michael Koelsch.

Books

Snowfall
The first book in the series, released in February 2002, focuses on a group of hunter-gatherers

Kingdom River
The second book was released in June 2003.

Moonrise
Moonrise, released in April 2004, tells the story of Prince "Baj" Bajazet, adopted son of Sam Monroe, the Archiving King.  When a coup backed by Boston wipes out the Middle Kingdom's royal family, save Bajazet, he becomes a man on the run.  Rescued by three Moonrisers, who call themselves Persons - people who are part man and part animal, created by Boston - Baj joins them in their quest to harm the city.

References

External links
 Seattle Times review of series

2003 novels
2004 novels
Fantasy books by series
Post-apocalyptic novels